Coolock is one of the baronies of Ireland. It was constituted as part of the old county of Dublin. Today, it covers much of the northern parts of the city of Dublin and the south-eastern part of the modern county of Fingal. At the heart of the barony is the civil parish of the same name - Coolock - which is one of twenty civil parishes in the barony.

Legal context and history
Baronies were created after the Norman invasion of Ireland as subdivisions of counties and were used for administration. While baronies continue to be officially defined units, they are no longer used for many administrative purposes. They have been administratively obsolete since 1898. Nevertheless, they continue to be used in land registration and specification such as in planning permissions. In many cases, a barony corresponds to an earlier Gaelic túath which had submitted to the Crown. However, the status of barony is still used in modern times

Location
It is one of seven and a half baronies that used to comprise the old county of Dublin. It stretches from Dublin Airport and the Malahide estuary to the Royal Canal and River Tolka estuary (from north to south) and from the Phoenix Park to Dublin Bay (from west to east). It is located between the baronies of Nethercross (to the north), Castleknock (to the west) and Dublin City (to the south). The northern two-thirds of the barony is now administered by Fingal County Council while the southern third is subject to Dublin City Council.

Civil parishes
For convenience, the table below groups the barony's twenty civil parishes by their location in one of the modern local authority areas. Some parishes, however, straddle both areas.

Note 1 In 1773, during the reign of King George III of Great Britain, the parishes were assessed as having the acreage as set out in the above table. In addition, the parishes of Kilossory and Kilbegh are mentioned as being in the barony with 900 and 500 acres respectively. Today, Killossory is in the barony of Nethercross but the date of its presumed transfer from this barony is unknown. The identity of Kilbegh is unclear although Kilbarrack may be a candidate. The source makes no mention of St George's parish.
Note 2 The parish of Clonturk is now mainly identified with the district of Drumcondra.
Note 3 The parish is St George is split between this barony and the barony of the City of Dublin. That part of the parish which lies in Coolock is bounded by the River Tolka to the north, Dublin Bay to the east and the Royal Canal to the south.
Note 4 An exclave of the parish of Swords lies in the barony. It is a single parcel of land, just over 5 acres in area - the townland of Glebe. Today, it is the site of the Metropoint Business Park.

The table below lists the population and the number of houses in the various civil parishes according to the 1851 census of Ireland.

External links
 Enhanced British Parliamentary Papers on Ireland - Census of Ireland 1851: part I
  Source given is "Ordnance survey".

References
From 

From other sources:

 
Coolock
History of Fingal